Allen Danziger is an American former actor, best known for his role as Jerry in The Texas Chain Saw Massacre (1974).

Biography

Danziger was born in the Bronx, New York. He graduated from City College of New York with a Bachelor of Science in Social Psychology and Social Work in 1964, and in 1970, he graduated from the University of Texas at Austin with a Masters Degree in Social Psychology and Masters Degree in Social Work.  In 1969, he made his movie debut in Eggshells. Five years later, he played Jerry in The Texas Chain Saw Massacre, his second film role. Following this, Danzinger retired from acting for 48 years until being cast as the narrator for the 2022 horror-comedy Cannibal Comedian.

Danziger has owned "Three Ring Service," an entertainment company, since 1978. The company provides entertainment for corporate events and parties. He participated in a documentary on The Texas Chain Saw Massacre, for the movie's DVD release. 

Allen lives in Austin, Texas and has a son, daughter-in-law, and 2 grandsons. Allen is now retired. 

Allen's current project is perfecting Chainsaw Jerry's Beef Jerky. "A Cut Above the Rest"

Personal life
 
He has one son, Jason, who, at 8 months old, had a cameo in Eggshells (1969). Allen and Jason live in Austin, Texas.

Partial filmography
Eggshells (1969) - Allen
The Texas Chain Saw Massacre (1974) - Jerry
Storage Locker (2022) - Kirby Leto
Cannibal Comedian (2022) - Narrator

References

External links

Allen Danziger website ChainsawJerry.com

American male film actors
Living people
Male actors from Boston
Moody College of Communication alumni
City College of New York alumni
Year of birth missing (living people)
Jewish American male actors